This is a list of diplomatic missions of Albania, excluding honorary consulates. Albania has diplomatic missions in 43 countries and 6 permanent missions accredited to various different international organizations around the world.

After the 2013 elections the Foreign Minister, Ditmir Bushati, said that the government would close a part of their diplomatic missions due to an economic crisis. In 2014 Albania closed its embassies in Kuala Lumpur (Malaysia), Lisbon (Portugal), Sarajevo (Bosnia and Herzegovina), and New Delhi (India).

Current missions

Africa

Americas

Asia

Europe

Oceania

Multilateral organisations

Gallery

Closed missions

Africa

Americas

Asia

Europe

See also

 Foreign relations of Albania
 List of diplomatic missions in Albania
 Visa policy of Albania

Notes

External links
 Ministry of Foreign Affairs of Albania

References

 
Missions
Albania